Fair Grove High School is a public high school serving 367 students in grades 9–12 located in Fair Grove, Missouri. The current principal is Chris Stallings and the Assistant Principal is Christian Overstreet. 96.5% of the students who attend the school are white, while 0.3% are black, 1.6% are Hispanic and 1.6% are Asian.

Notable alumni
Charity (Shira) Elliott (class of 1987), college basketball coach
Jason Hart (class of 1995), former Major League Baseball player

References

External links 

GreatSchools.net
City-Data.com

High schools in Greene County, Missouri
Public high schools in Missouri